Dilation is the debut album by comedian Rory Scovel released digitally on October 4, 2011 by Stand Up! Records.

Track listing

Reception
Dilation was met with positive reviews upon its release. The A.V. Club named it the 6th best comedy album of 2011, saying, "Dilation effortlessly bounces around myriad topics, and lets Scovel be an expert at all of them." LaughSpin says, "if you consider yourself a bit of comedy scholar, you’ll likely find great pleasure in Scovel’s unorthodox approach to cracking wise." The Huffington Post named Scovel and the album in their Guide to New Comedy Albums of 2011, saying, "He'll typically spiral a setup and punchline in circles and play with an audience's expectations with a masterfulness rarely seen in comedy today."

References

2011 debut albums
2011 live albums
Rory Scovel albums
2010s comedy albums
Stand-up comedy albums
2010s spoken word albums
Spoken word albums by American artists